Wiehl is a municipality in the Oberbergischer Kreis, in North Rhine-Westphalia, Germany. It is located approximately 41 km east of Cologne. The neighbouring municipalities Reichshof, Waldbröl, Nümbrecht, Much, Engelskirchen and Gummersbach border on the town.

Geography
Between the highway and Wiehl lies the biggest Wiehl industrial area, covering about 81 ha: Wiehl-Bomig. The river of the same name, Wiehl, flows by the town in an east–west direction.

History
Wiehl is first recorded in 1131 under the name of Wila. On the 1575 Mercator map it is shown as Wiell. Wiehl was eventually allocated in the 1604 Treaty of Siegburg to the Barony of Homburg and was subordinated with it to the House of Sayn-Wittgenstein. In 1815, the Congress of Vienna  assigned the little Homburg territory, which practically only consisted of the municipalities of Wiehl and Nümbrecht, to Prussia. At that time, Wiehl was still an agriculturally oriented settlement with a village character. Those in the population who could not earn a living from the land had to serve as migratory labour. Not until the second half of the 19th century were the conditions created for a significant increase in population. In 1860, the water power of the River Wiehl was first utilised by the Ohler Hammer Mill; in 1895, the river was used to generate electricity; the place was connected to the railway network in 1897 and the BPW Bergische Achsen factory was founded in 1898. The Nazi era left Wiehl a new town hall (today called the "Old Town Hall"). After the Second World War Wiehl integrated the influx of refugees who had been bombed out or expelled. In the municipal reorganisation in 1969, it was combined with Bielstein and Drabenderhöhe and, in 1971, 840 years after its first record, it was granted town rights. Since that time it has grown steadily, partly through the arrival of immigrants and through policies encouraging the growth of industry.

Coat of arms 
The coat of arms served the power Homburg as a basis of today's Wiehler coat of arms. It consists of a two tower castle with open gate and portcullis. The unresolved Knight of St John of Jerusalem cross over the right lower tower was taken at the association of the municipalities of Wiehl and Bielstein from the Bielsteiner coat of arms.

Villages

Leisure time

Sports
 Wiehltal stadium with little field (art lawn)
 Sports field Eichhardt
 Sports and gymnasia at the high school and the elementary school
 Solar open-air swimming pool with super slide
 Ice sports hall
 Sauna, undergoing a Kneipp cure plant
 Wiehlpark for leisure time, game and sports
 Walks in the Oberbergischen country

Culture and sights

Buildings

 Protestant church and half-timbered houses restored form the town center. In the foreground the river Wiehl. The Protestant church in hugging as is the largest of the Wiehler churches. The oldest part has stood since the 11th century. The nave was rebuilt repeatedly. The belltower remained at its place. The baptismal font is under the pulpit in the chancel from the 12th century (dismantled in the context of the last reorganization measures in 2003). The church extends along the main street in west east direction.
 Restored half-timbering ensemble in the upper village, classified as a historical monument
 The Bismarckturm is an outlook tower which was built at the emperor time 1909. It is 16.8 m high, has a regular hexagonal ground plan and was built from Grauwacke.
 One of the so-called colored Kerken, a church with medieval ceiling frescos, is in the district Marienhagen.

Museums
 The museum "axis, wheel and car" represents the 5.500 year history of the vehicle engineering on an over 1,000 m² large exhibition space: Wiehl-Ohlerhammer, admission free.
 Old agricultural equipment and machines are exhibited in the idyllically situated farmer museum: Wiehl, area Monsau.
 Siebenbürger Heimatstube in the arts center Drabenderhöhe. Insights into the still neat customs of the more than 800-year-old traditions and culture strive and arrange household effects in the seven citizen country.
 heritage-protected museum railway 'Wiehl Valley Railway (Wiehltalbahn)' with steam locomotive 'Waldbröl'

Regular events
 The international Wiehler Jazztage, these enjoy great attention in the Jazzscene, regularly take place (2004 already for the 15th time) since 1989. Well-known jazz musicians like Lilian Boutte (gospel song singer), Al di Meola (guitarist), Götz Alsmann, Lyambiko, Melva Houston, Albie Donnelly's super rank and many others have already appeared in Wiehl.
 Hundreds of different kinds of Dahlien can be inspected at the Wiehler Dahlienschau from August until October.
 Weekly market on Wednesday.
 Native country celebration at the Bismarckturm (beginning of June).
 Town celebration (in August).
 Christmas market at the 1st weekend in December

Other

 Get 30 m under the earth in the Wiehler dripstone cave marriage ceremonies of the Wiehler registry office are carried out regularly.
 Game park
 The "Oberbergische Postkutsche", a mail coach, runs between Nümbrecht and Wiehl every Friday, Saturday and Sunday from May to the end of October. It is a reproduction of the mail coach of the Imperial Post Office around 1871.
 Woods and nature trail
 In the Siefen below the dripstone cave ground monument "golden trough an old mountain work gallery which served the mining of iron ore and extended in branched pit countries to under the villages Hübender, cleric mountain and Abbenroth (municipality of Nümbrecht)". Siefen was mined in the 19th century, the support was finally adjusted 1912 because too low ores lined up at least since the beginning. The gallery served over decades of the Wiehler water supply later. At the restored gallery entrance built with mortar becomes the at times missing stone with the eingemeisselten inscription: Golden trough 1813 " built " again.
 About 6 km eastern of Wiehl Wiehltal dam.

Facilities for young and old
 1 of municipal and 2 church nursery schools
 Walldorf nursery school
 Town Youth meeting in the Bions store
 Ev. House of the youth
 Youth café "checkpoint"
 Youth hotel (youth hostel)
 Oasis open work for senior citizens
 Old and nursing home "Bethel"
 Welfare and social work and Knight of St John of Jerusalem health and advice center
 Knight of St John of Jerusalem accident help

Organizations
 Balloon sports-fans Oberberg e.V
 Choir Nostalgie
 YMCA Wiehl e.V.
 DLRG OG Wiehl
 DRK Ortsgruppe
 FV Wiehl 2000
 Judo Wiehl e.V.
 Kneipp-Verein Wiehl
 Maltese hospice group Wiehl
 Crazy golf sports club Wiehl
 Ecumenical initiative youth café Wiehl e.V.
 Sauerländischer Gebirgsverein SGV
 Chess club
 German shepherd organization OG Wiehl
 Competitive dancing TSC Wiehl
 TC Wiehl
 Tennis club Wiehl
 TUS Wiehl
 TUS Wiehl sportsIce sports club
 Baseball-team Wiehl
 Male-voice choir 1878 e.V. Wiehl

Parishes
 Ev. Parish Wiehl
 Ev .-free church municipality Wiehl
 Catholic parish Wiehl

Schools and educational institutions
 Community elementary school
 Dietrich Bonhoeffer high school
 Wiehltalhalle, hall of the high school for events of every kind
 School of music of the Homburgischen municipalities of registered association
 Circle adult education center department Wiehl
 Town library
 Kulturkreis Wiehl e.V.

Twin towns – sister cities

Wiehl is twinned with:
 Bistrița, Romania
 Crimmitschau, Germany
 Hem, France
 Yokneam Illit, Israel

Notable people 

 Laura Kampf, YouTuber, designer, and craftswoman

Literature
 Siegfried Lauff, "Wiehl in the change of the times 1-3", Wiehl and thinking ore groves 1978-1990
 Ulrich Melk, Chronik von Wiehl 1131 bis 1920, Wiehl 2001
 Torsten Sülzer, Vom Dorfbrunnen zum Wasserwerk : Die Geschichte der Wasserwirtschaft an Agger - Wiehl - Bröhl,
 Joachim Kleinmanns, Wiehl-Marienhagen, Broschüre - Rheinischer Verein für Denkmalpflege und Landschaftsschutz e.V.
 Dietrich Rentsch, Oberbergischer Kreis 2. Marienheide - Wiehl, 1976
 850 Jahre Wiehl 1131–1981, Festschrift zur 850-Jahrfeier der Stadt Wiehl, hg. v. Heimatverein Wiehl, o.O., o.J. [Wiehl 1982]
 Klaus Pampus: "Documentary first mentionings oberbergischer places" .Herausgeber (ed.): Bergischer history organization /Oberberg
 "food oatmeal piece of paper" into exercise book 3, "materials and sources for the oberbergischen regional history". Editor: H.J. Söhn and Lothar Wirths.  Ed. Bergischer history organization Oberbergische Abtlg.  2003
 Gottfr. Corbach: "Contributions to the Bergischen history". SCRIBA publishing house, Cologne. Stress this . Ausg.1976 . 
 the same: Represented and processed according to archival sources by Otto merchant to "the Homburg country in the Thirty Years' War", Brosch. ed. of the Raiffeisenbank Nümbrecht (1983)

References

External links
 Stadt Wiehl 
 Angfurten 
 Bielstein 
 Büttinghausen 
 Drabenderhöhe 
 Hübender 
 Marienhagen 
 Oberbantenberg 
 Oberwiehl 
 Museum "Achse, Rad und Wagen" 
 History of the Homburgischen Gemeinden Wiehl and Nümbrecht 
 'Wiehl Valley Railway (Wiehltalbahn)' 

Towns in North Rhine-Westphalia
Oberbergischer Kreis